Edward Krause may refer to:

 Moose Krause (Edward Walter Krause, 1913–1992), American college athlete and coach
 Edward C. Krause (1914–1950), American politician and businessman from Wisconsin
 Ed Krause, American attorney and 2010 candidate for the U.S. House of Representatives from North Carolina

See also
 Edward Kraus (disambiguation)